The Inter-Colonial Tournament was the main first class cricket competition in the West Indies held between 1892-93 and 1938-39.

Competing teams 
  Barbados
  British Guiana
  Trinidad

In the early tournaments British Guiana were sometimes referred to as Demerara. For simplicity British Guiana is used in the article.

The tournament was restricted to Amateurs. This excluded many of the leading black cricketers who were often Professionals.

Origins 

A tournament between Barbados, British Guiana and Trinidad took place in 1891. Each team played the other, and then there was a final between the leading two teams. During this tournament a suggestion was made by Hon. Aucher Warner that there should be a regular series of matches between the three colonies to be played alternately at each colony. 

By the time of the next tournament in 1893, a cup had been subscribed for but British Guiana were unable to take part, Barbados being winners again. This 1893 match is regarded as the first proper tournament.

Barbados as winners of the 1893 tournament were automatic finalists for the 1895 tournament, the other two teams playing to decide who would play them. The same procedure was used in the subsequent tournaments.

Due to travel costs and logistics of travelling to the other colonies, Jamaica never took part in the Inter-Colonial Tournament.

Results 

British Guiana did not take part in 1893–94. The 13th series was unfinished, the final between Trinidad and Barbados being left drawn with the Barbados team needing to catch the boat home.

Initially the tournament was held every two years but after the 8th series it became an annual event although a number of years were missed for various reasons.

Summary 

Of the 27 official series Trinidad won 11, Barbados won 10 and British Guiana won 5 with one unfinished.

Trinidad competed in 24 of the 27 finals, Barbados 19 and British Guiana 11.

In matches between Trinidad and Barbados, Trinidad won 11 and Barbados won 9 with 1 drawn. In matches between Trinidad and British Guiana, Trinidad won 13 and British Guiana won 6. In matches between Barbados and British Guiana, Barbados won 8 and British Guiana won 5.

References 

 Association of Cricket Statisticians and Historians – A Guide to First Class Cricket Played in the West Indies
 Association of Cricket Statisticians and Historians – Complete First-class Match List, Volume 1 1801–1914
 Association of Cricket Statisticians and Historians – Complete First-class Match List, Volume 2 1914/15-1944/45
 Association of Cricket Statisticians and Historians – First Class Cricket Matches (various years)
 First-Class Cricket: A Complete Record (various years)
 Statistics of West Indies Cricket 1865–1989, Jimmy Richards & Mervyn Wong
 CricketArchive

West Indian domestic cricket competitions
West Indian cricket in the 20th century
First-class cricket competitions